Harold Irwin Kaplan (October 1, 1927; January 15, 1998) was a psychiatrist and founding editor of the Comprehensive Textbook of Psychiatry.

Biography
Kaplan received his BA degree from New York University.  In 1949, at age 21, he received his Doctorate in Medicine from New York Medical College.

During his medical career, Kaplan was Professor of Psychiatry at the NYU School of Medicine.  He was also an Attending Psychiatrist at Bellevue Hospital, Lenox Hill Hospital, and NYU Langone Medical Center.

Kaplan was a Life Fellow of the American Psychiatric Association, the American College of Physicians, and the New York Academy of Medicine.  He helped found the NYU-Bellevue Psychiatric Association of New York.

Personal life and death
From 1953 to 1968 he was married to sex therapist Helen Singer Kaplan. He was also married to  Dark Shadows actor Nancy Barrett. Kaplan died on January 15, 1998. He is survived by his children Phillip, Peter, and Jennifer in addition to his grandchildren Alexander and Wildon.

Works

References

American psychiatrists
1927 births
1998 deaths
New York Medical College alumni
New York University faculty
20th-century American physicians